Black tax is a term that originated in South Africa for money that Black (or other person of color) professionals provide to their family every month outside of their own living expenses, usually out of obligation. It is caused by continued economic imbalance that can be traced back to apartheid and slavery. It has been described as Ubuntu but with an incapacitating twist for the black professional.

In popular culture
UK-based Zimbabwean author Masimba Musodza's short story entitled Black Tax explores the phenomenon in the context of Zimbabweans living in the United Kingdom and other wealthy nations who support relatives back home.

References

Family in South Africa
Social inequality
Economy of South Africa